A ploughshare or plowshare is a component of a plough or plow.

Ploughshare or  Plowshare may also refer to:
 Project Plowshare, United States project to use nuclear explosives for civilian purposes
 Ploughshare Innovations Ltd, a technology transfer company owned by the UK Defence Science and Technology Laboratory (Dstl)
 Ploughshare tortoise, Astrochelys yniphora, aka Angonoka Tortoise
 Ploughshare Wattle, Acacia gunnii
 Ploughshare vault, type of rib vault
 Plowshare (software), application to download/upload files
Ploughshares or Plowshares may also refer to:
 Ploughshares, American literary journal
 Ploughshares Fund, for prevention of weapons of mass destruction
 Plowshares Movement, anti–nuclear-weapons group
 Plowshares Project, Indiana peace studies project
 Project Plowshare, a serialized novel by Philip K. Dick

See also
 Swords to ploughshares, converting weapons to peaceful civilian applications